Stone Tavern may refer to:

Stone Tavern, New Jersey, United States
Stone Tavern at Roney's Point in West Virginia, United States